Chamanthedon xanthopasta is a moth of the family Sesiidae. It is known from South Africa and Zimbabwe.

References

Sesiidae
Lepidoptera of South Africa
Lepidoptera of Zimbabwe
Moths of Sub-Saharan Africa
Moths described in 1919